All About the Andersons is an American sitcom television series that originally aired on The WB from September 12, 2003 to February 12, 2004. It was canceled after one season.

Premise
Anthony Anderson is a single father and struggling actor who moves back into his parents' house only to find that his room has been rented out to a nursing student. Upon return, he realizes why he moved out in the first place.

Cast
 Anthony Anderson as Anthony Anderson
 John Amos as Joseph "Joe" Anderson
 Roz Ryan as Florence "Flo" Anderson
 Aimee Garcia as Lydia Serrano
 Damani Roberts as Tuga Anderson

Episodes

Reception
Michael Speier of Variety was generally positive in his review of All About the Andersons, noting that it was "a routine sitcom with tried-and-true mechanisms, but there's something brewing here that feels more distinct", and praised the series' star, stating "As a leading man, Anderson is a delight." Tom Shales of The Washington Post praised the "surprisingly effective dramatic moments between Anthony Anderson as a struggling actor and John Amos as Joe, his very hard-shelled dad." Tom Jicha of Sun-Sentinel was more mixed in his assessment of the series, declaring "There's a lot to like about All About the Andersons" but also warning that "Unfortunately, the material is boilerplate sitcom..."

References

External links
 

2000s American black sitcoms
2003 American television series debuts
2004 American television series endings
Television series about families
Television series by Warner Bros. Television Studios
English-language television shows
Television shows set in Los Angeles
The WB original programming